An air battle over Niš, Yugoslavia occurred on 7 November 1944 between the United States Army Air Force (USAAF) and the Soviet Air Force during World War II.

After the successful joint offensive in October 1944 and the expulsion of German forces to the north, the military units of the Red Army had been ordered to follow in their steps. On 7 November, a long column of vehicles belonging to 6th Guards Rifle Corps of the Red Army was moving from Niš towards Belgrade, with orders to reinforce the southern wing of the Hungarian front. Suddenly, at about 10:00 a.m., from southeast over Mount Jastrebac, three groups of American P-38 Lightning fighter planes of the 82nd Fighter Group arrived some 50 miles into Soviet held territory and the first group immediately started to strafe the leading vehicles, destroying several, with 31 killed and 37 wounded. The commander of the corps, Lieutenant General Grigory Petrovich Kotov, was also killed in this attack.

While the second group of American P-38s were starting their attack, the commander of the 17th Air Army, General Vladimir Sudets, who was at the Niš airbase at the time, issued an order for immediate takeoff to the pilots on duty flying Yakovlev Yak-3 fighters from 659th Regiment of 288th Air Division based at Niš, believing they were being attacked by German Focke-Wulf Fw 189 dual boom reconnaissance planes. The American planes shifted their fire to the Soviet fighters which were taking off in spite of clearly visible large red star markings on their wings. One of the Yak-3s was immediately destroyed.

According to aeronautical engineer Dragoslav Dimić, who as a child was among the gathered inhabitants of Niš, the remaining Soviet fighters flew over the old city fortress at an altitude of only  and attacked the Lightnings from below in a steep climb. One Lightning burst into flames and fell to the ground near the airstrip of the Niš airbase. The Yaks flew through the circling Lightnings and attacked them again, this time from above. One of the Yaks was hit by American fire and fell to the ground.

Soon the battle was joined by a second group of Yaks led by a famous Soviet fighter ace Captain Koldunov, who took off from another airbase near Niš. The 'tangle of death' that formed in the air moved westward across the city with the sound of machine gun and cannon fire. Nine Soviet Yak-3 and an unidentified number of US P-38 fighters participated in the battle, which lasted for about another 15 minutes. According to American author Glenn Bows, four Yaks and two Lightnings were lost, while Russian sources state that three Yaks and four P-38s had been destroyed. Joko Drecun, a Partisan officer who was based at Niš airport at the time, wrote in his diary that the Americans lost seven planes and the Soviets lost three.

The United States apologized to the Soviet Union, stating that the attack was the result of a grave error by American pilots sent to attack German forces on the road from Skopje to Pristina. On 14 December, American ambassador to the Soviet Union W. Averell Harriman apologized on behalf of Franklin D. Roosevelt and George C. Marshall and offered to send liaison officers to the 3rd Ukrainian Front to prevent further incidents; Stalin rejected it, because a line of demarcation had been drawn indicating the boundaries of Allied air actions.

See also
Belgrade Offensive

References

Bibliography

1944 in Yugoslavia
Niš
Balkans campaign (World War II)
November 1944 events
Soviet Union–United States relations
Niš